Alex Blanchard (born 3 January 1958) is a retired Dutch professional boxer who was active between 1979 and 1991. Between 1985 and 1987 he was rated as world's second light heavyweight boxer by the World Boxing Council. On 29 May 1984 he won the European light heavyweight title (EBU) by knocking out Richard Caramanolis in sixth round; before the bout Caramanolis was a reigning European Champion with a 27–0 record. Blanchard defended the EBU title five times, against Manfred Jassman (1984), Richard Caramanolis (1985), Andrew Andries (1985), Ralf Rocchigiani (1986) and Enrico Scacchia (1987), and lost it in 1987 to Tom Collins. On 11 February 1985, Blanchard won the vacant WAA title by knocking out Jerry Reddick in second round.

References

External links
Bokser Blanchard wil zijn comeback maken. parool.nl. 16 October 2009.
Personal website

1958 births
Living people
Light-heavyweight boxers
Dutch sportspeople of Surinamese descent
Dutch male boxers
Boxers from Amsterdam